The Beloved Brute is a 1924 American silent Western film directed by J. Stuart Blackton and starring Marguerite De La Motte, Victor McLaglen, and William Russell. It is based on the 1923 novel The Beloved Brute by Kenneth Perkins. This was English born McLaglen's first American film.

Plot
As described in a review in a film magazine, some unaccountable force causes Charles Hinges (McLaglen) to return to his father (McLean), who upbraids him for riotous living and brutality and tells him a man with a soul, his brother David (Russell), whom he has not seen since childhood, will prove his master. Charles, brooding, returns to a dance hall where China Jones (Holmes), a half-breed, is keeping a dancer named Jacinta (De La Motte) virtually a prisoner. She enlists Charles’ aid by playing up his strength and in a fierce fight with China’s aids he rescues her. The two and an old fortune-teller start out as a traveling troupe. In a small town, Charles is finally vanquished by his brother David in a wrestling match, and, believing he has lost Jacinta’s love, sends her away. David persuades her to go with him. China is killed, and, seeing a chance to get rid of David who is a reformer, the saloon-keeper prepares to lynch him as the murderer. Charles appears and tries to take the blame, so they decide to lynch them both. Jacinta rides and gets the sheriff’s posse after forcing the fortune-teller to confess, which saves the brothers. She rushes to David and he knows then that she loves him. David finally discloses his identity to Charles.

Cast

Preservation
A print of The Beloved Brute is located at the EYE Film Institute Netherlands. The completeness of this copy is unclear.

References

External links

 
 
 Still from silentfilmstillarchive.com

1924 films
1924 Western (genre) films
Vitagraph Studios films
Films directed by J. Stuart Blackton
American black-and-white films
Silent American Western (genre) films
1920s English-language films
1920s American films